Dino Gifford (6 January 1917 – 5 November 2013) was an Italian professional footballer who played as a midfielder for Viareggio, Livorno, Modena, Molinella, Le Signe and L'Aquila Calcio.

References

1917 births
2013 deaths
Italian footballers
F.C. Esperia Viareggio players
U.S. Livorno 1915 players
Modena F.C. players
Molinella Calcio 1911 players
L'Aquila Calcio 1927 players
Serie A players
Association football midfielders